Courtney Adele Dunbar Jones is an American lawyer who serves as a judge of the United States Tax Court.

Biography 

Jones earned her Bachelor of Science, magna cum laude, from Hampton University  and was the recipient of the President's Award for Exceptional Achievement. She earned her Juris Doctor from Harvard Law School, where she served for two years as the editor in chief of the Harvard BlackLetter Law Journal, (which has since been renamed the Harvard Journal on Racial & Ethnic Justice). She practiced for four years at Bird, Loechl, Brittain & McCants, a boutique law firm in Atlanta. Prior to joining the IRS she practiced for three years in the exempt organizations and intellectual property practice groups of the Washington, D.C.-based firm Caplin & Drysdale.

From 2011 to 2019, she was a senior attorney in the Tax-Exempt and Government Entities division in the Office of Chief Counsel of the Internal Revenue Service.

United States Tax Court service 

On January 23, 2018, President Donald Trump announced his intent to nominate Jones to an undetermined seat on the United States Tax Court. On January 24, 2018, her nomination was sent to the United States Senate. She was nominated to the seat vacated by Judge John O. Colvin, who assumed senior status in 2016. She was reported out of committee on December 13, 2018. On January 3, 2019, her nomination was returned to the President under Rule XXXI, Paragraph 6 of the United States Senate.

On February 6, 2019, her re-nomination was sent to the Senate. On March 26, 2019, her nomination was reported out of committee by a 28–0 vote. On August 1, 2019, her nomination was confirmed in the Senate by voice vote. She assumed office on August 9, 2019, for a term ending in 2034.

Achievements 

During law school, Jones was recognized for a variety of achievements; she was named a scholar in the Earl Warren Legal Training Program sponsored by the NAACP Legal Defense and Education Fund, and received the National Bar Institute African American Law Student Fellowship.

References 

1978 births
Living people
20th-century American women lawyers
20th-century American lawyers
21st-century American women lawyers
21st-century American lawyers
21st-century American judges
21st-century American women judges
African-American lawyers
African-American judges
Hampton University alumni
Harvard Law School alumni
Internal Revenue Service people
Judges of the United States Tax Court
United States Article I federal judges appointed by Donald Trump
Virginia lawyers